Teo Čorić (born 25 March 1992) is a Croatian handball player who plays for Bacău.

References

1992 births
Living people
Croatian male handball players
Handball players from Rijeka
Expatriate handball players 
Croatian expatriate sportspeople in Romania